Hendon is a rural town and locality in the Southern Downs Region, Queensland, Australia.

Geography

History
The town of Hendon developed after the opening of the Southern railway line from Gowrie Junction (near Toowoomba) to Hendon railway station on 11 March 1869.  The Southern line was extended to Millhill on 9 January 1871, and across the Condamine River to Cherry Gully on 8 December 1880, to Stanthorpe by 3 May 1881, reaching New South Wales border at Wallangarra on 14 February 1887.

Hendon was the name of a settler in the district.

Hendon Post Office opened on 1 April 1877 and closed in 1968.

Hendon Provisional School opened on 5 June 1882, later becoming Hendon State School. The school closed on 1 June 1954.

Hendon served as the railhead for the town of Allora (surveyed in 1859), located four miles to the northeast. Black-soil roads linking Allora with the railway were often impassable after heavy rain. The residents of Allora and the Allora Municipal Council lobbied for a railway connection, which was opened from Hendon to Allora on 21 April 1897. The railway was built under the Railways Guarantee Act (1895), which required the Allora Municipal Council to share any losses and profits with the Railway Department for a period of 14 years. Due to the branch line's short length, the revenue apportionment between the main and branch lines was adjusted in 1899 to ensure the branch line's receiving its fair share of income. When the guarantee expired, the Allora Municipal Council received £1,200 as its share of the profits. An extension of the branch to Goomburra (east of Allora) opened on 23 August 1912.

In its early days Hendon consisted of the Railway Hotel, a hall, the primary school and a golf course. The hotel was located in Railway Street, adjacent to the railway station. The primary school opened in 1882; in 1887 it had an enrollment of 195 students, but the building was destroyed by fire on 19 October 1926. The new school building was moved from View Glen (near Toowoomba) to Hendon, and was completed on 14 June 1927. It closed on 1 June 1954.

The township was surveyed into a number of residential blocks; streets were named for district towns, early settlers and streams (such as Maryvale, Goomburra, Leslie and Glengallan). The population slowly drifted away from Hendon, which resulted in the loss of public facilities. The hall was moved to a district farm, and the hotel and school buildings disappeared. The railway station in 1963 had a stationmaster in charge, a siding accommodation, a fork-line connection to the Allora branch, telegraph and signal communication, cattle, sheep and pig yards and a goods shed. As of 2011, apart from the railway lines all other infrastructure is gone. The Goomburra branch was closed beyond Allora on 1 July 1961, with the balance of the branch out of use by the mid-1990s.

A number of new homes have been built in Hendon, and the population is slowly increasing. A steel merchant operates within the town; this business is the only major commercial enterprise.

Education 
There are no schools in Hendon. The nearest government primary school is Allora State School in neighbouring Allora to the north. The nearest government secondary school is Allora State School (to Year 10), Clifton State High School (to Year 12) in Clifton to the north-west, and Warwick State High School (to Year 12) in  Warwick to the south-east.

References

Bibliography
Peter Doherty and Debbie Smith, Broad Horizons: The Story of Allora's Schools: Allora State School P&C, 1992
Marjorie Deacon, Allora Hundred Years: Allora Shire Council, 1969
Corbie Dhu, Allora's Past (1930)
Book of Lists: Queensland Railways, 1963

External links
 
 Town map, 1982

Towns in Queensland
Southern Downs Region
Towns in the Darling Downs
Localities in Queensland